Andrew Jenks (born September 21, 1990) is an American goalball player born with incomplete achromatopsia. 

He was introduced to play goalball at a school sports day at the age of 10.

References

External links 
 
 

1990 births
Living people
Male goalball players
Paralympic goalball players of the United States
Paralympic silver medalists for the United States
Paralympic medalists in goalball
Goalball players at the 2016 Summer Paralympics
Medalists at the 2016 Summer Paralympics
People from New Albany, Indiana